Robert I (? – after 1349) was a medieval French nobleman. For his services in the War of the Succession of Flanders and Hainault, Philip VI of France promoted the barony of Uzès into a viscountcy in 1328.

He married Guiote de Posquières, daughter of Raymond-Decan de Posquières, lord of Bellegarde, and of Simone de Caylar (or Cailar). Guiote brought in dowry to his husband lands of Bellegarde she inherited through her father.

References

Uzès family